Miss Europe 1961 was the 24th edition of the Miss Europe pageant and the 13th edition under the Mondial Events Organization. It was held in Beirut, Lebanon on 6 June 1961. Ingrun Helgard Möckel of Germany, was crowned Miss Europe 1961 by out going titleholder Anna Ranalli of Italy.

Results

Placements

Contestants 

 - Heidi Fischer
 - UNKNOWN
 - Sonja Menzel
 - Arlette Dobson
 - Ritva Tuulikki Wächter
 - Yvette Suzanne Dégremont
 - Ingrun Helgard Möckel†
 - Kalliopi Geralexi
 - Anne Marie Brink
 - Sigrún Ragnarsdóttir
 - Erika Spaggiari
 - Vicky Schoos
 - Rigmor Trengereid
 - Maria Del Carmen Cervera Fernández Núñez
 - Ingrid Andersson
 - Liliane Burnier
 - Neşe Durukan

References

External links 
 

Miss Europe
1961 beauty pageants
1961 in Lebanon